Jesse O. Sanderson High School, more commonly called Sanderson High School (SHS), is a co-educational 9–12 public high school located in Raleigh, North Carolina, United States in the Wake County Public School System. The school was founded in 1968. It is named after a former superintendent of Raleigh public schools, Jesse O. Sanderson. Sanderson runs on a 2x4 block schedule; it was one of the first schools in the area to do so. It is known for its performing arts, athletic, and community outreach programs.

Clubs 
Sanderson's student government has received recognition for their participation in the Sanderson community. It is one of the only four high schools in the state and 131 in the country to earn the National Association of Student Councils Gold Council of Excellence in 2010.

Performing arts 

Sanderson Theatre Ensemble
In 2018, Sanderson High School performed the play “26 Pebbles” by Eric Ulloa, a play about the Sandy Hook shooting, for the North Carolina Theatre Conference.

Sanderson Sandpipers
The director of the Sanderson Sandpipers, Marshall Butler Jr., has been recognized as an outstanding music educator by the North Carolina Symphony Orchestra. Marshall Butler retired at the end of the 201516 school year.

Athletics 

Sanderson has won thirty-four state championships.

Men's Cross Country
Sanderson's men's cross country team won the 2009 NCHSAA 4A State Championship.

Men's Soccer
Sanderson's men's soccer team has won eleven 4A state soccer championships. They also once held the national record for most consecutive games without a loss at 103, and is still the state record. Since the early 1980s, they have also produced a number of Division 1 players.

Cheerleading
Sanderson's cheerleading squad has won multiple state championships (2005, 2008, 2010).

Administration 
As of August 2019, Gretta Dula is the principal of Sanderson High School. Dula replaced Gregory Decker who served as the school's principal for over ten years. Decker is credited with the schools raising graduation rates over the same time frame. Cathey Moore, Decker's predecessor served in the position for seven years. In her time Cathey Moore was named principal of the year. She was promoted to assistant superintendent.

Demographic & economic background 

As of 2012, 28% of the students receive free lunch, 4% receive reduced-price lunch, and 68% receive no lunch benefits.

Notable alumni 
Tom Fetzer (1973), former Mayor of Raleigh and former chair of the North Carolina Republican Party
Steve Dobrogosz (1974), pianist and composer
 Steve Kenney (1974), NFL player for the Philadelphia Eagles; Offensive linesman at Clemson University
 David Sedaris (1975), noted author and humorist
 Jeb Bishop, American jazz trombone player
 Amy Sedaris (1980), author, humorist and actress; creator and star of the "Strangers with Candy" television series on Comedy Central and the 2006 major motion picture release of the same title
 Jeff Williams (1981), Chief Operating Officer of Apple Inc
Paul Friedrich (1985), cartoon artist
 Clark Brisson (1987), All-American soccer player at the University of South Carolina; Played eight years in the National Professional Soccer League; Currently assistant coach at the University of New Haven
 David Fox (1989), swimmer at North Carolina State University; 1996 Olympic gold medalist
 Caleb Norkus (1997), former professional soccer player who played for such teams as The Carolina Railhawks, Richmond Kickers, and Puerto Rico Islanders; also played for the U.S men's national team in 1995
 Darryl Partin (2006), former professional basketball player
 Annie E. Clark (2007), women's and civil rights activist
Matt James (2010), former college football player for the Wake Forest Demon Deacons and the first black Bachelor lead on season 25 of The Bachelor
Ryan Jeffers (2016), MLB player for the Minnesota Twins
Alim McNeill (2018), NFL defensive tackle for the Detroit Lions

References

External links 
 

Wake County Public School System
Educational institutions established in 1968
Public high schools in North Carolina
Schools in Raleigh, North Carolina
1968 establishments in North Carolina